A list of films produced in Egypt in 1957. For an A-Z list of films currently on Wikipedia, see :Category:Egyptian films.

External links
 Egyptian films of 1957 at the Internet Movie Database
 Egyptian films of 1957 elCinema.com

Lists of Egyptian films by year
1957 in Egypt
Lists of 1957 films by country or language